Egon Meyer is a retired East German rower who won the 1957 European Rowing Championships title in coxed four, together with Lothar Wundratsch, Gerhard Müller, Heinz Dathe and Dietmar Domnick. The men rowed for ASK Vorwärts Berlin. It was the first time that East Germany had its own team at the European Championships.

References

Year of birth missing (living people)
Living people
East German male rowers
European Rowing Championships medalists